Bairi (Tianzhu) Tibetan Autonomous County is in the prefecture-level city of Wuwei in the central part of Gansu province, China, bordering Qinghai province to the south and west. Its administrative seat is the town of Huazangsi.

Name
The Chinese name "Tianzhu" was named by a Tibetan Luo Haoxue in 1936, combining name of the largest lamasery in the County and the Zhugong lamasery.

The Tibetan name Bairi is pronounced Bairi in Standard Tibetan, and pronounced Hwari in the local Amdo Tibetan and Huarui (华锐) in Chinese.

An alternative Tibetan name is Tenzhu, which is a transcription of the Chinese name Tianzhu.

History 
The county was established as the Tianzhu District of Yongdeng County in 1949, but became an autonomous county of Wuwei in the next year. In 1955, Tianzhu was moved under the administration of Zhangye as the first autonomous county in China. Between 1958 and 1961, Gulang County was part of Tianzhu. In 1961 the county was placed under Wuwei again.

Administrative divisions
Tianzhu Tibetan Autonomous County is divided to 14 towns, 5 townships  and 2 others.
Towns

Townships

Others
 Tianzhu Building Material Factory
 Tianzhu Coal and Electricity Company

Geography 
The county is mountainous, being located at the tripoint of the Tibet Plateau, the Loess Plateau and the Inner Mongolia Plateau, with elevations ranging from 2040 m to 4874 m. It is divided into the watersheds of the Shiyang River and the Yellow River and crossed by the Wushao Mountain. South of the Wushao Mountain, the climate is continental and north of it, the climate is semi-arid. The land is mostly covered by grasslands and forests.

Transport 
China National Highway 312
Lanzhou–Xinjiang Railway crosses the county, with a station (Tianzhu) in the county seat. With the construction of the Wushaoling Tunnel under the Wushao Mountain Range (Wushaoling), about the half of the section of the main track of this railway within this county is actually underground.

Ethnic groups in Tianzhu, 2000 census

References

Further reading 
 A. Gruschke: The Cultural Monuments of Tibet’s Outer Provinces: Amdo - Volume 2. The Gansu and Sichuan Parts of Amdo, White Lotus Press, Bangkok 2001. 
 Tsering Shakya: The Dragon in the Land of Snows. A History of Modern Tibet Since 1947, London 1999, 

Tibetan autonomous counties
County-level divisions of Gansu
Wuwei, Gansu